The Tehran Peace Museum is a  member of the International Network of Museums for Peace. The main objective of the museum is to promote a culture of peace through raising awareness about the devastating consequences of war, with a focus on the health and environmental impacts of chemical weapons.

Currently housed in a building donated by the municipality of Tehran within the historic City Park, the Tehran Peace Museum is as much an interactive peace center as a museum.

On June 29, 2007, a memorial for the poison gas victims of the Iran–Iraq War (1980–88), along with a Peace Museum, was completed in a park in Tehran, capital of Iran. These facilities were established by the Society for Chemical Weapons Victims Support (an Iranian NGO), the city of Tehran, some other NGOs, and individuals and groups in Hiroshima.

The museum coordinates a peace education program that holds workshops on humanitarian law, disarmament, tolerance, and peace education. At the same time, it hosts conferences on the culture of peace, reconciliation, international humanitarian law, disarmament, and peace advocacy.

Additionally, the museum houses a documentary studio that provides a workspace wherein the individual stories of victims of warfare can be captured and archived for the historical record. The museum’s peace library includes a collection of literature spanning topics from international law to the implementation of peace to oral histories of veterans and victims of war. The 3D Holographic images are exhibited here. They have been made from the portraits of Iran–Iraq War's Martyrs. They designed by Hesam Bani-Eghbal and his team on Hesam Animation Studio.

Permanent and rotating peace-related art exhibitions, displaying the work of amateur international and Iranian artists and children's drawings, are also housed in the museum complex. Finally, the Iranian secretariat for the international organization Mayors for Peace is housed in the Tehran Peace Museum.

Founding the Iranian Peace Museum Movement
Its founding began with a conversation between the founders of the Tehran-based Society for Chemical Weapons Victims Support (SCWVS) and a coordinator for the International Peace Museums Network. This, as well as a visit to Hiroshima, Japan by members of SCWVS, fed into the desire for a museum in Tehran.

It was in Hiroshima where the suffering from atomic arms was able to convert most powerfully into a drive for peace manifested via a peace museum. This ability to use the intense suffering of war to highlight the need for peace made the Tehran Peace Museum’s founders realize Iran's parallel suffering from chemical arms and the need for a parallel drive for peace.

Focus on survivor involvement
While visiting Hiroshima Peace Memorial Museum, the founders of the Tehran Peace Museum realized the necessity of involving the victims of war in the creation of the museum. Only these individuals could provide credible accounts of the harsh realities of war and their correlating desire for peace. The most moving, enthusiastic, and relevant of these war survivors emerged as the Iranian victims of Saddam Hussein's chemical weapons attacks, the majority of whom were already in contact with SCWVS. This group of victims has proven to be extremely passionate about sharing their stories and serving as living monuments to the atrocities of war.

Opening ceremony of the new building
On June 29, 2011, concurrent with the anniversary of the gas attack on the city of Sardasht in 1987 and the Day of Campaign against Chemical Weapons, the new building of the Tehran Peace Museum was officially opened for public. during the ceremony, a number of guests from different countries, including the director of Hiroshima peace museum, a delegation representing the survivors of Hiroshima atomic bombing, survivors of chemical weapons attack from Halabja, Northern Iraq, as well many Iranian activists and war veterans attended.

Some recent activities
An observance of the International Day of Remembrance for all victims of chemical warfare was held in the Tehran Peace Museum on Sunday, April 29, 2012. Many participants attended the event, including survivors of chemical warfare, representatives of international organizations, academics, journalists, and others.

In the memorial ceremony, messages of the UN Secretary General and the OPCW (Organization for the Prohibition of Chemical Weapons) Director General were delivered.

Other parts of the program included a statement by a representative of the Iranian victims of chemical warfare, music performance, and the planting of olive trees.

Information for visitors

Address: Northern gate of the City Park (Park-e Shahr), Tehran, Iran.

Tel: +98-21-66731076

Days closed: Friday

Opening Hours: From 9 am to 5 pm every day

Admission: Free

References

Further reading

External links
 Tehran Peace Museum official website
 International Network of Museums for Peace website

Museums in Tehran
Peace museums
2007 establishments in Iran
Museums established in 2007
Chemical weapons in the Iran–Iraq War